Kuttam is a village in the Tirunelveli District of Tamil Nadu, India. It comes under the administration of Radhapuram taluk and Thisayanvilai firka (revenue block).

References

Villages in Tirunelveli district